Windows of Heaven is Jefferson Starship's first studio album since reforming in 1992 and ninth album overall. It was first released in Germany, but the band told fans to wait for a new American remixed version.  The single "Let Me Fly" was released along with the American release, but did not chart on the Billboard charts. Grace Slick joined the band in the studio to record vocals on "I'm on Fire" which only appears on the American and Japanese versions. The track "Maybe for You" later reappeared on the 2008 album, Jefferson's Tree of Liberty.

German Version Track Listing (1998)

Official US/Japan Remixed Version Track Listing (1999)

Singles
"Let Me Fly"

Personnel
Marty Balin - vocals, acoustic guitar
Jack Casady - bass
Paul Kantner - vocals, acoustic and electric 12-String guitar, glass harmonica, synthesizer, banjo
Diana Mangano - vocals
Slick Aguilar - lead guitar
T Lavitz - piano, synthesizer, Hammond B-3 organ
Prairie Prince  - drums and percussion, Celtic drum, electronic and alien percussion, marimba, rainstick

Additional personnel
Darby Gould – lead vocals on "Shadowlands"
Amy Excolere – supporting vocals on "Shadowlands"
Grace Slick – co-lead vocals on "I'm on Fire"
Tim Gorman – piano, synthesizer on "Shadowlands" and "Which Side Are You On?"
Tony Menjivar – LP congas on Marty's Songs
Alexander Kantner – additional guitar on "Let Me Fly"

Production
Paul Kantner – producer
Marty Balin – producer
Tom Flye – producer
Produced at Coast Recorders, San Francisco
Michael Gaiman – executive producer
Gary Veloric – executive producer
James Delaney – executive producer on US / Japan version
Ron Rainey – executive producer on US / Japan version
Paul Stubblebine – mastering at Rocket Lab for German version
George Horn – mastering at Fantasy Studios for US / Japan version
Henry Howell – equipment manager
Prairie Prince – art director, photography
Diana Mangano – photography
Mick Anger – computer art

References

1998 albums
CMC International albums
Jefferson Starship albums